Damajadasri III (Brahmi ) was a ruler of the Western Satraps. His reign lasted possibly from c. 251 AD to 256 AD.

Biography
Damajadasri was one of the four sons of Damasena. Damajadasri was the youngest of his siblings. He succeeded his elder brother Vijayasena as a ruler.

He most likely held the title of mahaksatrapa. There is no evidence that he would have held the office of ksatrapa.

Large amounts of coins struck in name of Damajadasri have been found.

Damajadasri was succeeded as Western Satrap by his nephew Rudrasena II who was a son of Viradaman.

References

Further reading

External links
Coins of Dāmajādasri III. Coin India – The Virtual Museum of Indian Coins

Western Satraps
3rd-century Indian monarchs